Nannocetus is an extinct baleen whale belonging to the family Cetotheriidae.

Description
It is characterized by the ventral orientation (in posterior view) of the postglenoid process; postglenoid process twisted medially (in ventral view) relative to the anteroposterior axis of the skull; equal projection of the ventral and dorsal lobes of the tympanic than the dorsal lobe; deeper notch separating the two lobes of the tympanic; reniform morphology of the tympanic in ventral view; lip of the tympanic slightly inflated; sub-rectilinear medial edge of the involucrum with a step in its anterior third; anterior process of the petrosal sub-triangular; thin crista transversa of the petrosal; and pars cochlearis hemispherical.

Taxonomy and classification
The holotype is UCMP 26502. It was collected from the Late Miocene (Messinian) Towsley Formation of Humphreys, Los Angeles County, California. It has been traditionally assigned to Cetotheriidae since its description, a classification that still stands and has been vindicated by recent cladistic analyses of 'cetothere' relationships.

References

Baleen whales
Miocene cetaceans
Miocene mammals of North America
Prehistoric cetacean genera
Fossil taxa described in 1929
Taxa named by Remington Kellogg